Mykanów  is a village in Częstochowa County, Silesian Voivodeship, in southern Poland. It is the seat of the gmina (administrative district) called Gmina Mykanów.

The village has a population of 1,002.

References

Villages in Częstochowa County
Piotrków Governorate
Kielce Voivodeship (1919–1939)